Raymond William Gartner (1934-1983) was an Australian rugby league player who played in the 1950s and 1960s.

Playing career
Gartner had a long and successful career at Canterbury-Bankstown, playing eleven seasons and over 200 grade games between 1953-1964. He also captained the N.S.W. Colts against Great Britain in 1954. He was the son of Newtown and Canterbury legend, Joe Gartner.

Gartner died from leukemia on 24 January 1983, aged only 49.

References

1934 births
1983 deaths
Australian rugby league players
Canterbury-Bankstown Bulldogs players
Ray
Rugby league five-eighths
Rugby league players from Sydney